Eggs And Bacon Bay is a community in Tasmania within the local government area of Huon Valley.  It is approximately 44 km from the state capital Hobart and 17 km from the nearest township Cygnet. Eggs and Bacon Bay covers an area of 1.24 square kilometres. The population was 102 residents at the 2016 census.

The main geographical feature of the small town is Eggs & Bacon Bay beach. It is 400m long, 300m deep, rated in the lowest Surf Life Saving Australia Beachsafe hazard category (level 1) & is therefore desirable for families. It has parking, public toilets, picnic table facilities & a boat ramp.

The unusual name is said to be based on the yellow and streaky red eggs-and-bacon flowers that grow in the area from the pea family of Fabaceae. An alternative, though likely untrue, story is that Lady Jane Franklin, wife of the 18th century governor John Franklin, ate bacon and eggs there around 1840.

References

Localities of Huon Valley Council